The 2016 NBL Finals was the championship series of the 2015–16 NBL season and the conclusion of the season's playoffs. The Perth Wildcats defeated the New Zealand Breakers in three games (2–1) to claim their seventh NBL championship.

Format
The 2015–16 National Basketball League Finals were played in February and March 2016 between the top four teams of the regular season, consisting of two best-of-three semi-final and final series, where the higher seed hosts the first and third games.

Qualification

Qualified teams

Ladder

Seedings

 Melbourne United
 Perth Wildcats
 Illawarra Hawks
 New Zealand Breakers

The NBL tie-breaker system as outlined in the NBL Rules and Regulations states that in the case of an identical win–loss record, the results in games played between the teams will determine order of seeding.

Bracket

Semi-finals series

(1) Melbourne United vs (4) New Zealand Breakers

Regular season series

New Zealand won 3–1 in the regular season series:

(2) Perth Wildcats vs (3) Illawarra Hawks

Regular season series

Perth won 4-0 in the regular season series:

Grand Final series

(2) Perth Wildcats vs (4) New Zealand Breakers

Regular season series

Tied 2–2 in the regular season series; 347-327 points differential to New Zealand:

See also
 2015–16 NBL season

References

Finals
2016
2016 in New Zealand basketball